Isaac Ayipei (born 1 January 1965) is a Ghanaian retired footballer who played as a forward. He during his career played for teams like Berekum Arsenal, Leones Negros UdeG, León, Veracruz, Rubin Kazan and La Piedad. Besides Ghana, he has played in Mexico.

Career

In 1992, he signed for León.

References

1965 births
Living people
Ghanaian footballers
Ghanaian expatriate footballers
Ghanaian expatriate sportspeople in Mexico
Ghanaian expatriate sportspeople in Russia
Association football forwards
Berekum Arsenal players
Liga MX players
Leones Negros UdeG footballers
Club León footballers
C.D. Veracruz footballers
La Piedad footballers
Russian Second League players
Russian First League players
FC Rubin Kazan players